Kozhencherry East, is a village in Pathanamthitta district of Kerala, India.

See also
 Pathanamthitta

References 

 Villages in Pathanamthitta district